Middle Drove was a railway station which served the nearby village of Tilney Fen End (situated 1 mile to the north northeast) near Downham Market in Norfolk, England. The station was opened in 1848 as an extension of the East Anglian Railway's line from Magdalen Road station (now known as Watlington) to Wisbech East. The station's location, like that of the neighbouring Smeeth Road station, was fairly rural and the line eventually closed in 1968.  Middle Drove's station building survived closure, and has since been converted into a private residence.

In October 2022, demolition work was carried out to remove the platform, waiting room and station canopy. The station house remains, but an application for planning permission has been submitted for its demolition and replacement.

References

Disused railway stations in Norfolk
Former Great Eastern Railway stations
Railway stations in Great Britain opened in 1848
Railway stations in Great Britain closed in 1968